Rumpel is a card game, similar to Quodlibet that is native to the Danube region from Regensburg to Linz, but is played especially in the region of Hauzenberg in the German county of Passau. Mala describes a version with 8 or 12 contracts from a menu of 29 called Großer Rumpel.

History 
Compendium games are not new. The similar, albeit more elaborate, game of Quodlibet has been played since at least 1861, particularly in student circles as a drinking game. In a 400th anniversary magazine for the University of Tübingen that year, students from Mainz describe the rules for Quodlibet. Mala states that Rumpel is a relic of the Ottoman Wars. 

Rumpel was apparently being played in Erlangen as early as the 1850s because it is mentioned as one of the games, along with Tarock and Skat, that had "long since superseded Schlauch" around that time.

In 1890, we read of a Rumpel competition taking place in a pub in Griesbach near Passau, alongside the game of Grasobern. There were prizes: one each for apparently different games or contracts, known as Naturrumpeln, Generalquarte and Mach-Rumpeln, as well as for the most and fewest Stangen (marks) and for each team which finished first.

However, as a student game, Rumpel was introduced to Hauzenberg in the 1970s by teacher, Karl Rothdauscher, who worked there for 31 years. The name of the game in Hauzenberg is derived from the special contract of Rumpel. A game of Rumpel consists of a sequence of eight individual contracts. In special cases there are also the special contracts of Quart and even Rumpel.

Aim 
The aim of Rumpel is to score as few penalty points as possible.

Rules 
Rumpel is played with normal Bavarian pattern Doppelkopf cards by four to nine players. Each of them completes four rounds that are known as 'kingdoms' (Königreiche).

In each contract, players must follow suit (Farbzwang) but do not have to win the trick (i.e. no Stichzwang). Only penalty points are recorded. The contracts in each kingdom, together with their individual objectives, are as follows:

Oberei: To avoid taking tricks in which there are one or more Obers.
Manderlspiel: To capture as many court cards as possible.
Quarten: Only the fourth card in suit sequence after the previous one may be played. If, for example, the Eight of Leaves is played, it must be followed by the Unter of Leaves. 
Greteln: Each player is dealt six cards; eight cards are placed face up on the table. These together with one's hand cards are used to form and take pairs (Ace with Ace). Anyone who cannot form a pair, must lay his cards face up on the table.
Herzerei:  To avoid tricks with Heart cards. The Seven of Hearts scores 8 penalty points; the Ace of Hearts scores 1.
Fressen: Each player is dealt just 3 cards; the rest remain face down on the table as the talon. Anyone who cannot follow suit, must pick a card from the talon until he can follow suit. If the first, second and third player shed all their cards; scores are recorded.
Eins-Zwei-Drei: The first trick scores one penalty point, the second 2 etc. If a player takes all tricks, the others score 25 penalty points each and the game is repeated. 
Achmed. Forehand looks at his cards and announces a contract.

Rumpel: This special contract is inserted if anyone has the cards from Seven to Ace in his card. Obers may be used as wild cards. Rumpel scores up to 60 penalty points.

Großer Rumpel 
Großer Rumpel is simply Rumpel but with eight or twelve contracts selected from a field of twenty-nine. These include all the above with the exception of Greteln. However, Manderlspiel is known as Plus, Eins-Zwei-Drei as Progress and Fressen as Fessare. In many of the contracts, if a player fully achieves the opposite aim, the remainder lose and incur penalty points. All the contracts can be played as individual games; indeed Grün-Ober and Bierkopf (Kappa in this list) are traditional Bavarian games. The remaining contracts comprise the following:

Siebnerei: To avoid capturing Sevens (Siebner).
Achtern: To avoid capturing Eights (Achten).
Alle Neun: To capture Nines (Neunen).
Zehnerfang: To avoid capturing Tens (Zehnen).
Untergang: To avoid capturing Unters.
Grün-Ober: To avoid taking the first or last trick or the Green Ober.
Ultimo: To avoid taking the first or last tricks.
Xerxes: To avoid capturing the K.
Minus: To avoid capturing any court cards.
Regress: To avoid taking tricks; each successive trick costing fewer points.
Majorsequenz: To avoid taking tricks that contain sets or sequences.
Quodlibet: To avoid capturing Obers or Sevens while playing 'blind'.
Solo: To score as many card points as possible. Ace-Ten game.
Straßenraub: To score as few card points as possible. Ace-Ten game. Ouvert.
Eichenlaub: As Solo, but only Leaves and Acorns count.
Schellenherz: To score as few points as possible; only Bells and Hearts count.
Transmission: To take as many points as possible, passing tricks to the right.
Kappa: Play as for Bierkopf. Partnership game.
Peredo: Partnership game in which only cards of the same rank beat.
Handel: Three-card game along the lines of Commerce
Stichwahl: Forehand decides which trick loses the deal.

References

Literature  
 Holzapfel, Roland (2008) Ein "Rumpler" sucht Gleichgesinnte. In: Passauer Neue Presse, 03 June 2008 (p. 10)
 Kalb, Wilhelm (1892). Die Alte Burschenschaft und ihre Entwicklung in Erlangen. Erlangen: Max Mencke.
 Mala, Matthias (2004). Das Grosse Buch der Kartenspiele. Munich: Bassermann. Originally published 1997, Munich: Falken.

External links 
 Rumpel at www.br.de. Retrieved 13 Sep 2018.

William Tell deck card games
Compendium games
Historical card games
Student culture
Passau (district)
Four-player card games